China Coal may represent
 China National Coal Group, sometimes known as China Coal, the second largest coal mining enterprise in China, a state-owned enterprise.
 China Coal Energy a subsidiary of China National Coal Group, a publicly traded company
 Coal power in China, the situation of coal power in People's Republic of China.